Luis Britto García (born 9 October 1940, in Caracas) is a Venezuelan writer, playwright and essayist. His fiction has been recognised twice with the Casa de Las Américas Prize, for his works Rajatabla (1970) and Abrapalabra (1979). In 2002, he was the winner of Venezuela's National Prize for Literature, given as a lifetime achievement award. In 2005 he was recognized with the Ezequiel Martínez Estrada honorary award of Casa de Las Américas. In May 2012, he was appointed by President Hugo Chávez to the Venezuelan Council of State, "the highest circle of advisers to the president" provided for in the Venezuelan Constitution.

Life
Britto García graduated as a lawyer from the Central University of Venezuela in 1962 and obtained a doctorate in law from the same university in 1969. He obtained a diploma in Latin American studies at the École pratique des hautes études in Paris in 1982. He taught at the faculty of economics and social sciences of the Central University of Venezuela from 1966, becoming a full professor in 1988. His non-fiction work includes several historical studies of Caribbean pirates in the early Spanish Empire, including Demonios del mar: corsarios y piratas en Venezuela 1528-1727 ("Demons of the Sea: Corsairs and Pirates in Venezuela 1528-1727").

Britto García is however best known for his fiction. His two best known works are 1970's Rajatabla and 1979's Abrapalabra, both winners of the Casa de Las Américas Prize. Rajatabla is a collection of short stories which are "characterized by humour and irony, [and] refer to political repression and violence". Abrapalabra is a novel "which explores the cultural and political development of Venezuela" in the twentieth century.

Partial bibliography

Fiction
Los fugitivos y otros cuentos (1964). Caracas: Pensamiento Vivo.
Vela de armas (1970)
Rajatabla (1970) - Casa de Las Américas Prize (1970)
Abrapalabra (1979) - Casa de Las Américas Prize (1979), Monte Ávila Editores - Premio Municipal del Distrito Sucre, Caracas (1980).
La orgía imaginaria o Libro de utopías (1983). Caracas: Monte Ávila Editores
Me río del mundo (1984)
Pirata (1998)
Andanada (2005) - "2006 Premio Nacional del Libro (Venezuela), categoría Mejor libro de autor venezolano en el extranjero". Barcelona: Thule Ediciones, 
Pare de sufrir (2006). Caracas: Biblioteca Últimas Noticias
Arca (2007). Caracas: Seix Barral Biblioteca Breve

Non-fiction
Ciencia, tecnologia, y dependencia (1975)
La máscara del poder: del Gendarme Necesario al Demócrata Necesario (1988) Caracas: Alfadil Ediciones
El poder sin la máscara: de la Concertación Populista a la Explosión Social (1990) - Premio Municipal de Literatura, Mención Ensayo
El imperio contracultural: del rock a la posmodernidad] (1991)
Demonios del mar: corsarios y piratas en Venezuela 1528-1727 (1999)
Elogio del panfleto y de los géneros malditos (2000) Mérida: Editorial Libro de Arena
Golpe de gracia (2001)
País de petróleo, pueblo de oro (2003)
Por los signos de los signos (2006)
Socialismo del Tercer Milenio (2008)
El pensamiento del Libertador (2010)
Dictadura mediática en Venezuela (2012)  - Casa de las Américas Ezequiel Martínez Estrada Essay Prize.

See also 
Literature of Venezuela
List of Venezuelan writers

More reading 
 The Birth of Subcultures and Countercultures: on the Ideal of Nation and the Struggle between the Alienated and the Hegemony - Anthony López Get (2018)

References

External links
  Britto Garcia blog
  Bibliography
  mcnbiografias.com, Britto Garcia

1940 births
Living people
Venezuelan novelists
Venezuelan male writers
Male novelists
Venezuelan dramatists and playwrights
Central University of Venezuela alumni
Academic staff of the Central University of Venezuela
École pratique des hautes études alumni
Male dramatists and playwrights
Writers from Caracas